The second season of the American television series Hannibal premiered on February 28, 2014. The season is produced by Dino de Laurentiis Company, Living Dead Guy Productions, AXN Original Productions, and Gaumont International Television, with Sidonie Dumas, Christophe Riandee, Katie O'Connell, Elisa Roth, David Slade, Chris Brancato, Michael Rymer, Steve Lightfoot, Martha De Laurentiis, and Bryan Fuller serving as executive producers. Fuller serves as the series developer and showrunner, writing or co-writing eleven episodes of the season. 

The season was ordered in May 2013. The season stars Hugh Dancy, Mads Mikkelsen, Caroline Dhavernas, Hettienne Park, and Laurence Fishburne, with Scott Thompson and Aaron Abrams receiving "also starring" status. The series is based on characters and elements appearing in Thomas Harris' novels Red Dragon (1981), Hannibal (1999), and Hannibal Rising (2006) and focuses on the relationship between FBI special investigator Will Graham and Dr. Hannibal Lecter, a forensic psychiatrist that is secretly a cannibalistic serial killer. The episodes of the season are named after the different elements of Japanese haute cuisine.

The season premiered on February 28, 2014, on NBC. The season premiere received 3.27 million viewers with a 1.1/4 ratings share in the 18–49 demographics. The season ended on May 23, 2014, with an average of 2.54 million viewers, which was a 12% drop from the previous season. The season received acclaim from critics and audiences, praising the performances, writing, character development, cinematography and faithfulness to its source material. The season finale, "Mizumono", received universal acclaim in particular. In May 2014, NBC renewed the series for a third season.

Cast and characters

Main
 Hugh Dancy as Will Graham
 Mads Mikkelsen as Dr. Hannibal Lecter
 Caroline Dhavernas as Alana Bloom
 Hettienne Park as Beverly Katz
 Laurence Fishburne as Jack Crawford
 Scott Thompson as Jimmy Price
 Aaron Abrams as Brian Zeller

Recurring 
 Raúl Esparza as Dr. Frederick Chilton
 Lara Jean Chorostecki as Freddie Lounds
 Katharine Isabelle as Margot Verger
 Gillian Anderson as Bedelia Du Maurier
 Cynthia Nixon as Kade Prurnell
 Patrick Garrow as James Gray
 Eddie Izzard as Abel Gideon
 Daniel Kash as Carlo
 Michael Pitt as Mason Verger
 Anna Chlumsky as Miriam Lass
 Jeremy Davies as Peter Bernardone
 Chris Diamantopoulos as Clark Ingram
 Ryan Field as Roland Umber
 Mark O'Brien as Randall Tier
 Kacey Rohl as Abigail Hobbs
 Gina Torres as Phyllis "Bella" Crawford
 Jonathan Tucker as Matthew Brown
 Vladimir Jon Cubrt as Garrett Jacob Hobbs

Notable guests
 Martin Donovan as Jack Crawford's therapist
 Maria del Mar as Marion Vega
 Shawn Doyle as Leonard Brauer
 Amanda Plummer as Katherine Pimms

Episodes

Production

Development
Around May 2013, trades reported that many services, including Amazon Prime Video, were willing to pick up the series if NBC passed on it, as the network put the renewal announcement on hold until the end of the month. On May 30, 2013, NBC renewed the series for a second season. NBC Entertainment President Jennifer Salke commented, "We're so proud of Bryan's vision for a show that is richly textured, psychologically complex, and very compelling. There are many great stories still to be told." Salke also mentioned that a factor in the renewal was the series' risky content, hoping that it could send a message to content creators as "we support a big, risky event kind of vision like that."

Writing
Before the series even premiered, Bryan Fuller already had an idea for how the season would go, "season 1 is the bromance, season 2 the horrible breakup." The season was divided into two chapters, with the first chapter belonging to Graham in the Baltimore State Hospital for the Criminally Insane, and the second chapter involving Graham's release and subsequent pursuit of Lecter. Fuller did it as he felt the season's storytelling was "organic".

Fuller said that the season would explore more about Will Graham, "Will knows something no one else knows, and it’s a great place to put a character. One of the things I was most excited about in Season 2 was seeing Will Graham hit rock bottom." He also teased, "a scrappy Will Graham coming out swinging. We get to see what happens when he fights back."

Mads Mikkelsen discussed the possible scenarios for the season, "I see three different scenarios and they're all very interesting. One is that FBI Agent Will Graham knows what I'm doing and I know that he's knowing it. The other one is that he has no idea and he's still in his blurry world I can manipulate. And the third one, which is very interesting, is that he knows but he's not telling me. So he's going to play me now. That would be interesting."

Casting

In June 2013, it was reported that the producers approached David Bowie to play Count Robert Lecter, Hannibal Lecter's uncle, during the season. Despite the character's fate in the novel Hannibal Rising, Fuller stated that they could accommodate the character to appear in the present day scenes. Due to Bowie's schedule, he was unable to take the role but the crew were told by his agents to ask again for availability for the third season.

In September 2013, Cynthia Nixon joined in the recurring role of Kade Prurnell, "an employee of the Office of the Inspector General in FBI Oversight who is investigating the events of the first season and Jack Crawford's culpability." According to Fuller, Prurnell was based on the character Paul Krendler, who debuted in the novel The Silence of the Lambs. As the series didn't have access to characters originating from the novel, Fuller changed the name, with "Kade Prurnell" serving as an anagram for "Paul Krendler".

The season also introduced two characters from the novel, Hannibal, Margot and Mason Verger. In January 2014, Katharine Isabelle and Michael Pitt were announced to play Margot and Mason in recurring roles.

Among guest stars, Martin Donovan appeared in "Sakizuke", playing Jack Crawford's therapist. Amanda Plummer appeared in "Takiawase" as Katherine Pimms, "a hippie-chic acupuncturist who's been causing trouble." Jeremy Davies and Chris Diamantopoulos guest starred in "Su-zakana" and "Shiizakana". Davies played Peter Bernardone, "an animal rescue worker who becomes a suspect when a bizarre murder is discovered at a stable where he once worked"; Diamantopoulos played Clark Ingram, "Peter's longtime social worker who has perhaps been too influential in his client's life".

Jonathan Tucker guest starred as Matthew Brown, an orderly at the Baltimore State Hospital for the Criminally Insane. The original plan was having the character Barney Matthews, who appeared in The Silence of the Lambs. However, the series didn't receive permission to use it, so the producers created a new character based on Barney, making him "younger and perhaps a little more opportunistic." Fuller originally wanted Chi McBride, whom he worked with on Pushing Daisies, to play Barney Matthews.

Filming
The season started filming in August 2013.

Release

Broadcast
In December 2013, NBC announced that the season would premiere on February 28, 2014. The season moved to a new timeslot, Fridays at 10:00pm, after airing its previous seasons on Thursdays at 10:00pm.

Marketing
On July 18, 2013, the cast and crew attended the 2013 San Diego Comic-Con to promote the season. In October 2013, Fuller revealed a teaser poster for the season, which highlighted "The Stag Man". He explained, "After a horrifying descent into madness in season 1, this image ironically represents the perspective of a scrappier, clearer-minded Will Graham in season 2. The scales have fallen from his eyes and he finally sees Hannibal Lecter for the monster he is." The first trailer for the season debuted in January 2014.

Home media release
The season was released on Blu-ray and DVD in region 1 on September 16, 2014.

On June 5, 2020, the season was available for streaming on Netflix. It exited the service on June 4, 2021.

Reception

Viewers

Critical reviews
The season received acclaim from critics. On Rotten Tomatoes, the second season scored an approval rating of 98% with an average rating of 9.3/10 based on 45 reviews. The consensus reads: "With powerful imagery and a strong, unpredictable story, season two of Hannibal continues to build on the first season's promise." On Metacritic, the second season scored 88 out of 100 based on 14 reviews, which constitutes "universal acclaim". On April 10, 2014, Hannibal was voted the winner for Hulu's "Best in Show" online competition.

Mark Peters of Slate called Hannibal "an engrossing, psychologically dense show that is also visually stunning... the kind of gem seldom found on network TV." He did however note that the female characters were less developed. Matt Zoller Seitz, writing for New York magazine heaped praise on the show, calling it "serenely unlike anything else on TV or anything that ever has been on TV." Alan Sepinwall of HitFix continued his praise of the series, highlighting the performances of the lead actors. The A.V. Club named it the best TV series of 2014, and wrote that Hannibal was "the best, most elegantly designed thrill ride on TV in 2014".

The season finale, "Mizumono", was met with universal critical acclaim. Gathering a perfect rating of 10 out of 10 on IGN, reviewer Eric Goldman stated, "Hannibal ended its fantastic second season with a thrilling, exciting and audacious series of events" and praised the directing by David Slade. The finale also earned a perfect "A" grade by The A.V. Club, where reviewer Molly Eichel called it "an entirely perfect cap to this season." Den of Geek reviewer Laura Akers labelled the episode "simply divine" and stated that she has "rarely found [herself] looking forward to a show's return more". Emma Dibdin of Digital Spy also heavily praised the episode, specifically Mikkelsen's performance, stating that he is "so convincingly predatory...and so simultaneously scary and sad". She also laid praise on the sound design of the episode by saying that "the integration of a ticking clock worked so well not just in the usual 'time is running out' way, but also a subconscious reminder of Hannibal's manipulation of Will". TV Guide named it the best TV episode of 2014.

Critics' top ten lists
The season appeared in many "Best of 2014" lists, becoming the ninth most mentioned series in the lists.

Awards and accolades

References

External links 
 
 

Hannibal (TV series)
2014 American television seasons